Tatabánya (Hungarian: Tatabánya vasútállomás) is a railway station in Tatabánya, Komárom-Esztergom County, Hungary. The station opened on 15 July 1884. The station is located on the main line between Vienna and Budapest (Line 1 Budapest–Hegyeshalom railway), Line 12 Tatabánya–Oroszlány railway and Line 13 Tatabánya–Pápa railway. The train services are operated by MÁV START.

Train services
The station is served by the following services:

RailJet services Zürich - Innsbruck - Salzburg - Linz - St Pölten - Vienna - Győr - Budapest
RailJet services Munich - Salzburg - Linz - St Pölten - Vienna - Győr - Budapest
RailJet services Frankfurt - Stuttgart - Munich - Salzburg - Linz - St Pölten - Vienna - Győr - Budapest
EuroCity services Vienna - Győr - Budapest - Kiskunmajsa - Novi Sad - Belgrade
EuroCity services Vienna - Győr - Budapest - Debrecen - Nyíregyháza
EuroNight services Munich - Salzburg - Linz - St Pölten - Vienna - Győr - Budapest
EuroNight services Vienna - Győr - Budapest - Szolnok - Arad - Bucharest
Intercity services Sopron / Szombathely - Répcelak / Csorna - Győr - Budapest

References

External links

Railway stations opened in 1884
Railway stations in Hungary